Kim Hee-jung (Korean: 김희정; born January 31, 1979), better known as Kim E-Z (Korean: 김이지), is a South Korean singer and rapper, formerly a member of the Korean girl group Baby V.O.X.

Pre-debut
Kim E-Z graduated from Kyung Hee University's dance program in 1997.

Career
As its oldest member, Kim had been the leader of Baby V.O.X and had been assigned the 'sexy' role in the group. She was the group's rapper and sang sub vocals.

In March 2006, after Baby V.O.X broke up, Kim decided to pursue an acting career. She has also worked as an MC for MNET.

She is married to a stock manager Song Hyun Seok since April 2010 and gave birth to her first son on April 5, 2011.

References

External links
 EZ Kim Profile on Beautiful Voices.Net

Living people
South Korean women pop singers
Kyung Hee University alumni
1979 births
South Korean female idols
21st-century South Korean singers
21st-century South Korean women singers